Edward Nelson Sprague Jr. (born July 25, 1967) is an American former Major League Baseball third baseman. He played 11 seasons in the major leagues from 1991 to 2001, with six different teams.  He later served as the head baseball coach of the NCAA's Pacific Tigers for 12 seasons, from 2004 to 2015. He is now the Oakland Athletics Director of Player Development. 

Sprague is the only baseball player ever to win the College World Series, an Olympic championship, and the World Series. He is also the only baseball player to win the College World Series two years in a row and the World Series two years in a row.

College career and Olympics
Sprague was an NCAA standout where he played third base helping Stanford win College World Series championships in 1987 and 1988. In 1986, he played collegiate summer baseball with the Cotuit Kettleers of the Cape Cod Baseball League. He collected an Olympic Gold Medal in the 1988 Olympics on the men's baseball team. (However, because baseball was a demonstration sport that year, the medals were unofficial and did not count towards respective countries' medal counts.) He is a member of Delta Tau Delta International Fraternity.

Sprague was drafted in the first round of the 1988 Major League Baseball draft by the Toronto Blue Jays.

Major league career
Sprague made his debut in 1991 for the Toronto Blue Jays and was a part of the 1992 and 1993 World Series championships. He is particularly remembered for hitting the game-winning home run in the ninth inning of Game 2 of the 1992 Series against the Atlanta Braves. His best individual year came in 1996 when he hit .247 with 36 home runs and 101 runs batted in.

Sprague was a regular with Toronto until 1998, when he was traded to the Oakland Athletics. He was granted free agency at the end of 1998, and then played for the Pittsburgh Pirates in 1999, for which he made his only All-Star game appearance. That year, he hit .267 with 22 homers, 81 RBI and a .352 on-base percentage, the best of his career as a regular player.

In 2000, Sprague played for the San Diego Padres and Boston Red Sox. After becoming a free agent at the end of the year, he signed with the Seattle Mariners for the 2001 season, playing in 45 regular season games. He signed a minor league contract with the Texas Rangers in early 2002, but did not return to the major leagues.

Sprague twice led the league in getting hit by pitches and finished with a career total of 91. Sprague is the only baseball player ever to win championships in the College World Series, the Olympics, and the World Series.

Sprague's final career totals include 1203 games played, 506 runs, 1010 hits, 225 doubles, 12 triples, 152 home runs, 558 runs batted in, a .247 batting average, a .318 on-base average, and a .419 slugging average.

According to a report in the Stockton Record, Sprague said he used performance-enhancing substances later banned by Major League Baseball and admitted hitting a home run with a corked bat.

Coaching career
Sprague was the head coach of the Pacific Tigers college baseball team from the 2004 season until he resigned following the 2015 season.

In 2016, Sprague returned to Major League Baseball as a Special Assistant to the General Manager of the Oakland Athletics. He was named Director of Player Development following the 2019 season.

Personal life
Sprague and his wife Kristen Babb-Sprague, who is an Olympic Gold Medalist in synchronized swimming, have four children. Their daughter Payton attended the University of Wisconsin-Madison School of Business and currently works in the Oakland Athletics front office. Their son Jed plays baseball at University of Nevada, and was selected by the Chicago White Sox in the 37th round of the 2014 MLB Draft. His other kids are Paris and John. Sprague is an alumnus of St. Mary's High School in Stockton, California.

Sprague's father, Ed Sr., pitched in the majors from 1968 through 1976.

Head coaching record
Below is a table of Sprague's yearly records as an NCAA head baseball coach.

See also
 List of second-generation Major League Baseball players

References

External links
, or Retrosheet, or Pelota Binaria (Venezuelan Winter League)

1967 births
Living people
American expatriate baseball players in Canada
Baseball players at the 1987 Pan American Games
Baseball players at the 1988 Summer Olympics
Baseball players from California
Boston Red Sox players
Cardenales de Lara players
American expatriate baseball players in Venezuela
Cotuit Kettleers players
Dunedin Blue Jays players
Major League Baseball third basemen
Medalists at the 1988 Summer Olympics
National League All-Stars
Oakland Athletics players
Oklahoma RedHawks players
Olympic gold medalists for the United States in baseball
Pacific Tigers baseball coaches
Pan American Games medalists in baseball
Pan American Games silver medalists for the United States
People from Castro Valley, California
Pittsburgh Pirates players
Rancho Cucamonga Quakes players
San Diego Padres players
Seattle Mariners players
Sportspeople from Castro Valley, California
Stanford Cardinal baseball players
Syracuse Chiefs players
Tacoma Rainiers players
Toronto Blue Jays players
Medalists at the 1987 Pan American Games